Lake Herman State Park is a South Dakota state park in Lake County, South Dakota in the United States.  The park is open for year-round recreation including camping, swimming, fishing, hiking and boating on the 1,350-acre Lake Herman. There are 72 campsites which feature electric hook-ups and 4 cabins.

The namesake Lake Herman has the name of Herman Luce, a pioneer who settled near it.

References

External links
 Lake Herman State Park

Protected areas of Lake County, South Dakota
State parks of South Dakota